Allué  is a village under the local government of the municipality of Sabiñánigo, Alto Gállego, Huesca, Aragon, Spain.  There is a Romanesque church from the 12th Century, nature trails leading into the Sierra de San Juan and views of the Spanish Pyrenees.  There is a Casa Rural Guesthouse called Casa Vera, which also serves as a yoga and meditation retreat centre.

Populated places in the Province of Huesca
Sabiñánigo
Towns in Spain